Topaz is a rural locality in the Tablelands Region, Queensland, Australia. In the  Topaz had a population of 165 people.

History 
Extensive alluvial Gold mining between the 1870's and 1914 (World War 1). Major mines included The Lady Olive, Union and Kiandra Ck. These area was designated the Extended Upper Russell River Goldfield.

Topaz State School opened on 23 February 1932 and closed on 1960.

In the  Topaz had a population of 165 people.

References 

Tablelands Region
Localities in Queensland